Jesús María Espinosa Fernández (1908–1995) was a Colombian painter. He was born in the town of Belalcázar, in the Department of Cauca, Colombia on August 10, 1908.

He painted in several genres and techniques but mostly an impressionism style was seen in his works. Among his most important achievements was the creation of the first Visual Arts School of Painting in the city of Cali, Colombia. This school is currently part of the 'Instituto Departamental de Bellas Artes'.

Biography
Jesús María was a descendant of José María Espinosa (1796–1883), a painter and miniaturist known for his portraits of Antonio Nariño and of Simón Bolivar. As a youngster, Espinosa's paternal grandfather taught him how to paint; supported by him, Espinosa figured out a way to extract pigments from vegetables in order to give color to his first paintings.

He was educated in the city of Popayán, Colombia and then began his formal study of painting at the Escuela de Bellas Artes, in the capital Bogotá. He took lessons from art teacher Roberto Pizano (1896–1929). In 1929, he was awarded a scholarship by the Colombian government and traveled to Paris to continue his studies in painting at the prestigious Académie Julian, under the direction of Paul Albert Laurens (1870–1934).

When he returned to Colombia, he set up a small academy in the city of Cali. He met composer Antonio Maria Valencia (1902–1952) who suggested that Espinosa move his small academy of painting to the newly founded Cali's School of Fine Arts; then Espinosa founded the Visual Arts School in 1934.

He died in the city of Cali, Colombia in 1995 at the age of 86.

In 1933 Antonio María Valencia Zamorano, pianist and composer, who directed the Conservatory of Music in Cali, created by Resolution No 32 of the City Council, aims to start a School of Fine Arts and decides to call the young teacher Jesus Maria Espinosa, who was returning from Paris, after further studies art at one of the famous French art centers of the period: "The Academy JULIAN" conducted by Maestro Paul Albert Laurent.

Before traveling to Paris, Espinosa studied painting in Fine Arts in Bogotá, under the direction of maestro Roberto Pizano. While there, in 1929 he won a government scholarship contest, which took him to Europe.

In the opposite street of the Municipal Theater, now occupied by Pro-Arts, the art school was officially founded by Decree No. 98 of 1934 from the Government of Valle. It is named as founder and director of the same, Jesus Maria Espinosa Fernandez.

He started painting classes and later brought Gerardo Navia a sculptor from Palmira. Shortly after, Matjasic Roko a Yugoslav artist moves from Chile to our school to teach the classes of mural and color theory.

In the year 1939 the Fine Arts School of Music and Painting moved to the current location at the Centennial neighborhood.

Espinosa is recognized nationally and internationally as an artist that mastered the technique of oil painting, and watercolor mural. Several of his disciples have emerged as important artists, including: Edgar Negret, Hernando Tejada, Otilia Hernandez, Labrada Bernardino, Hernando Polo, Daniel Romero, Luis Aragon, Gustavo Rojas, Marino Tenorio among others.

Gallery

References

External links
 Colarte webpage
 Official galleries for the artist
 Document containing references to the artist
 Artist's description
 Documentary with images of JM Espinosa Antonio María Valencia: música en cámara

1908 births
1995 deaths
Académie Julian alumni
20th-century Colombian painters
20th-century Colombian male artists
Colombian male painters